Vedrana Vučićević (born 14 March 1985) is a Bosnia and Herzegovina cross-country skier. She competed in the women's 10 kilometre classical at the 2006 Winter Olympics.

References

External links
 

1985 births
Living people
Bosnia and Herzegovina female cross-country skiers
Olympic cross-country skiers of Bosnia and Herzegovina
Cross-country skiers at the 2006 Winter Olympics
Sportspeople from Sarajevo
Serbs of Bosnia and Herzegovina